The governor of the State of Yucatan is the head of the executive branch of the Mexican state of Yucatán, elected to a six-year-term and not eligible for reelection.
The figure of the governor is established on the Constitution of the State of Yucatan on its Title Fifth. The term of the Governor begins on October 1 of the year of the election and finishes September 30, six years later.

The same constitution empowers those individuals to be elected governor who have held the title of executive power but in a different way to the popular election, namely the interim, or temporary replacements. The latter has caused controversies and political conflicts, because in the view of several instances is in conflict with a precept of the Political Constitution of the United Mexican States that stipulates that no state governor may hold power for more than six years.

List of governors of Yucatan 
The state of Yucatán was created on January 31, 1824, being one of the original states of the federation, which along their history has passed through all the systems of government in place in Mexico: the federal system as the central system, so that the name of the entity has varied between state and department; varying with it, the name of the holder of the executive branch of the State.

Individuals who have occupied the governorship in the state of Yucatán, in its various denominations, have been:

16th century
 (1526 - 1540): Francisco de Montejo. Adelantado.
 (1540 - 1546): Francisco de Montejo the Younger. Captain General.
 (1546 - 1549): Francisco de Montejo. Adelantado.
 (1550 - 1552): Gaspar Juárez de Ávila- First Mayor
 (1552 - 1553): Tomás López Medel
 (1553 - 1554): Francisco de Montejo the Younger. Captain General and governor.
 (1554 - 1554): Francisco Tamayo Pacheco
 (1554 - 1555): Álvaro Carvajal
 (1555 - 1558): Alonso Ortiz Delgueta	
 (1558 - 1559): Juan de Paredes	
 (1560 - 1560): García Jufré de Loaiza	
 (1561 - 1564): Diego de Quijada - First Mayor appointed directly by the king.	
 (1565 - 1571): Luis de Céspedes y Oviedo (first Captain General of Yucatán).
 (1571 - 1572): Diego de Santillán
 (1573 - 1576): Francisco de Velásquez Gijón
 (1577 - 1581): Guillén de las Casas
 (1582 - 1592): Francisco de Solís
 (1593 - 1596): Alonso Ordóñez de Nevares
 (1596 - 1597): Carlos de Sámano y Quiñónez

17th century 

 (1598 - 1604): Diego Fernández de Velasco
 (1604 - 1612): Carlos de Luna y Arellano
 (1612 - 1617): Antonio de Figueroa y Bravo
 (1617 - 1619): Francisco Ramírez Briceño (first Captain General of Yucatán)
 (1620 - 1621): Arias de Lozada y Taboada
 (1621 - 1628): Diego de Cárdenas
 (1628 - 1630): Juan de Vargas Machuca
 (1630 - 1631): Íñigo de Argüello y Carvajal, oidor of Real Audiencia de México
 (1631 - 1633): Fernando Centeno Maldonado (interim)
 (1633 - 1635): Jerónimo de Quero
 (1635 - 1636): Fernando Centeno Maldonado (interim)
 (1636 - 1636): Andrés Pérez Franco
 (1636 - 1643): Diego Zapata de Cárdenas
 (1643 - 1644): Francisco Núñez Melián
 (1644 - 1645): Enrique Dávila Pacheco (interim)
 (1645 - 1648): Esteban de Azcárraga
 (1648 - 1650): Enrique Dávila Pacheco (interim)
 (1650 - 1652): García de Valdés y Osorio
 (1652 - 1653): Martín de Robles y Villafaña (interim)
 (1653 - 1654): Pedro Sáenz Izquierdo (interim)
 (1655 - 1660): Francisco de Bazán
 (1660 - 1662): José Campero de Sorredevilla
 (1663 - 1664): Juan Francisco de Esquivel y la Rosa (interim)
 (1664 - 1664): Rodrigo Flores de Aldana
 (1664 - 1667): Juan Francisco de Esquivel y la Rosa (interim)
 (1667 - 1669): Rodrigo Flores de Aldana
 (1669 - 1670): Frutos Delgado (interim)
 (1670 - 1672): Fernando Francisco de Escobedo
 (1672 - 1674): Miguel Franco Cordóñez de Soto (Miguel Francisco Cordonio de Sola)
 (1674 - 1677): Sancho Fernández de Angulo y Sandoval
 (1677 - 1679): Antonio de Layseca y Alvarado
 (1679 - 1680): Juan de Aréchiga (interim)
 (1680 - 1683): Antonio de Layseca y Alvarado
 (1683 - 1688): Juan Bruno Téllez de Guzmán
 (1688 - 1692): Juan José de la Bárcena
 (1693 - 1695): Roque de Soberanis y Centeno
 (1695 - 1696): Martín de Urzúa y Arizmendi
 (1696 - 1699): Roque de Soberanis y Centeno
 (1699 - 1703): Martín de Urzúa y Arizmendi

18th century 

 (1703 - 1706): Álvaro de Rivaguda (interim)
 (1706 - 1708): Martín de Urzúa y Arizmendi
 (1708 - 1712): Fernando de Meneses y Bravo de Saravia
 (1712 - 1715): Alonso de Meneses y Bravo de Saravia
 (1715 - 1720): Juan José de Vértiz y Hontañón
 (1720 - 1724): Antonio Cortaire y Terreros
 (1725 - 1733): Antonio de Figueroa y Silva
 (1733 - 1734): Juan Francisco Fernández de Sabariego
 (1734 - 1736): Santiago de Aguirre (interim)
 (1736 - 1742): Manuel Salcedo
 (1743 - 1750): Antonio Benavides Bazán y Molina
 (1750 - 1752): Juan José de Clou
 (1752 - 1758): Melchor de Navarrete
 (1758 - 1761): Alonso Fernández de Heredia
 (1761 - 1762): José Crespo y Honorato. Put down the rebellion and determined the torture and death of Jacinto Canek, leader Maya.
 (1762 - 1763): Antonio Ainz de Ureta (interim)
 (1763 - 1763): José Álvarez (substitute)
 (1763 - 1764): Felipe Ramírez de Estenoz
 (1764 - 1764): José Álvarez (substitute)
 (1764 - 1770): Cristóbal de Zayas (interim)
 (1771 - 1776): Antonio de Oliver
 (1777 - 1777): Alonso Manuel Peón
 (1778 - 1778): Hugo O'Conor Cunco y Fali
 (1779 - 1779): Alonso Manuel Peón (substitute)
 (1779 - 1782): Roberto Rivas Betancourt (interim)
 (1783 - 1789): José Merino y Ceballos
 (1789 - 1792): Lucas de Gálvez
 (1792 - 1792): Alonso Manuel Peón (substitute)
 (1792 - 1793): José Sabido Vargas (interim)
 (1793 - 1800): Arturo O'Neill y O'Kelly

19th century 

 (1800 - 1810): Benito Pérez Valdelomar (start of war of independence of México)
 (1811 - 1812): Justo Serrano (lieutenant governor and acting governor, con Antonio Bolo)
 (1812 - 1812): Miguel de Castro y Araoz (King's lieutenant governor and acting governor)
 (1812 - 1815): Manuel Artazo y Torredemer
 (1815 - 1819): Miguel de Castro y Araoz
 (1820 - 1820): Mariano Carrillo de Albornoz
 (1821 - 1821): Juan María Echeverri y Manrique de Lara (last Spanish governor of Yucatán, from 1 January 1821 to November 8 of that year)
 (1821 - 1822): Pedro Bolio y Torrecillas. independent Mexico, pre-constitutional period.
 (1822 - 1822): Benito Aznar
 (1822 - 1823): Melchor Álvarez. pre-constitutional period.
 (1823 - 1823): Pedro Bolio y Torrecillas
 (June 1, 1823 - April 23, 1824): Interim Governing Board, chaired by José Segundo Carvajal Cavero
 (1824 - 1824): Francisco Antonio de Tarrazo (interim)

From independence to the Mexican Revolution 

 José Tiburcio López Constante 1825
 Santiago Méndez Ibarra 5 terms, 1840s-1850s
 Miguel Barbachano 5 terms, 1841-1853
 Crescencio José Pinel
 Manuel Cepeda Peraza 1860s
 General Protasio Guerra 1877
 José María Iturralde 1878
 Manuel Romero Ancona 1878-1882
 General Octavio Rosado 1882-1886
 General Guillermo Palomino 1886-1889
 Juan Pío Manzano 1889-1890
 Colonel Daniel Traconis 1890-1894
 Carlos Peón Machado 1894-1897
 José María Iturralde 1897-1898
 General Francisco "Pancho" Cantón 1898-1902
 José María Iturralde 1897-1898
 Olegario Molina 1902-1910
 Enrique Muñoz Arístegui (acting) 1907-1910
 José María Pino Suárez 1911
 Jesús L. González 1911
 Nicolás Cámara Vales
 Agustín Patrón Correa
 Nicolás Cámara Vales
 Fernando Solís León
 Arcadio Escobedo
 Felipe G. Solís
 Eugenio Rascón
 Prisciliano Cortés
 Eleuterio Ávila
 Toribio de los Santos
 Abel Ortiz Argumedo
 Salvador Alvarado Rubio 1915-1918
 Carlos Castro Morales
 Enrique Recio
 Francisco Vega Loyo
 Tomás Garrido Canabal
 Antonio Ancona Albertos
 Hircano Ayuso O'Horibe
 Manuel Berzunza

Governors of the Free and Sovereign State of Yucatan since the Revolution 

 (1922–1924): Felipe Carrillo Puerto
 (1924):  Juan Ricárdez Broca (usurper)
 (1924): Miguel Cantón (acting)
 (1924–1926): José María Iturralde Traconis
 (1926–1930): Álvaro Torre Díaz
 (1930–1934): Bartolomé García Correa, National Revolutionary Party, PNR
 (1934–1935): César Alayola Barrera, PNR
 (1935–1936): Fernando Cárdenas, PNR
 (1936–1938): Florencio Palomo Valencia, PNR
 (1938–1942): Humberto Canto Echeverría, Party of the Mexican Revolution, PRM
 (1942–1946): Ernesto Novelo Torres, PRM
 (1946–1951): José González Beytia 
 (1951–1952): Humberto Esquivel Medina 
 (1952–1953): Tomás Marentes Miranda 
 (1953–1958): Víctor Mena Palomo 
 (1958–1964): Agustín Franco Aguilar 
 (1964–1970): Luis Torres Mesías 
 (1970–1976): Carlos Loret de Mola Mediz 
 (1976–1982): Francisco Luna Kan 
 (1982–1984): Graciliano Alpuche Pinzón 
 (1984–1988): Víctor Cervera Pacheco 
 (1988–1991): Víctor Manzanilla Schaffer 
 (1991–1993): Dulce María Sauri Riancho 
 (1993–1994): Ricardo Ávila Heredia 
 (1994–1995): Federico Granja Ricalde 
 (1995–2001): Víctor Cervera Pacheco 
 (2001–2007): Patricio Patrón Laviada 
 (2007–2012): Ivonne Ortega Pacheco 
 (2012–2018): Rolando Zapata Bello 
 (2018–2024): Mauricio Vila Dosal

See also
List of Mexican state governors

References

 "Table of Yucatan's Governors During the Porfiriato," in Alan Wells and Gilbert Joseph, Summer of Discontent, Seasons of Upheaval: Elite Politics and Rural Insurgency in Yucatán, 1876-1915 (Stanford: Stanford University Press, 1996), 23.

Yucatan
1546 establishments in New Spain